Calilegua National Park is a federally protected area in Jujuy Province, Argentina.It was established on July 19, 1979, and houses a representative sample of the Southern Andean Yungas biodiversity in good state of conservation.

It is the largest national park in the Argentine Northwest.

History

The area was occupied by native groups whose settlements were located in the lower knoll, near farming grasslands. The archeological pieces and sites found in the park, such as pieces of pottery and polished stone axes, are related to the communities that inhabited the Yungas region. From the 15th century, the Incas occupied this territory. This region is currently inhabited by Kolla communities.

The landscape of the park can be seen when transiting through Provincial Route 83. There are three landscapes along the route: the jungle foothills, the mountain forest, and the mountain woods, each with its characteristic vegetation.

About 270 species were identified in the area, and it is estimated that 230 more could inhabit the area, which makes Calilegua the home of 50% of all bird species in the country. The park is home to the jaguar, the largest South American predator, along with other cats like the jaguarundi, the ocelot, the puma, and the pampas cat. The largest mammal in the Yungas, the tapir, also inhabits the reserve.

Calilegua National Park and nearby towns offer tours related to ecotourism and active tourism, but the area also offers a strong cultural imprint. Tourists interested may visit several towns where they can experience local contact.

Climate
The park has a subtropical climate with a dry winter season. In contrast, occasional frosts can occur at the high altitudes. The park receives  of precipitation per year with most of it falling between November to April. During these months, rainfall is often intense.

See also 
 Baritú National Park

References

External links
Administración de Parques Nacionales (Argentine National Parks Administration, in Spanish and English)

National parks of Argentina
Protected areas of Jujuy Province
Protected areas established in 1979
Southern Andean Yungas